WZTI (1290 AM) is a radio station in Greenfield, Wisconsin serving Milwaukee that currently airs an oldies format. The station is owned by the Milwaukee Radio Alliance, a partnership between Times-Shamrock Communications and All-Pro Broadcasting, along with sister stations WLUM-FM and WLDB.  Its studios are located in Menomonee Falls and the transmitter site is in Franklin.

For many years, the station aired various African-American-oriented talk and music formats.

History
The station launched in 1947 with the WMLO call sign. WMLO was an affiliate of the ABC Radio Network. It later became WMIL. A sister FM station, WMIL-FM, was added in 1961.  WMIL was affiliated with the CBS Radio Network from June 26, 1961  until December 1963.

The stations were owned from 1968 to 1988 by Malrite Broadcasting. As WMIL, they aired a country music format. The station called itself "Big M Country." WMIL also simulcast the country format on 95.7 FM until that signal switched to beautiful music as "WMVM, Stereo Radio 95.7" Milwaukee's Voice of Music, around 1971. Both stations switched to Top 40 as WZUU and WZUU-FM in 1972. In 1981, WZUU flipped to oldies first as "Solid Gold 13Z", then with a move to make it more distinguished from WZUU-FM as WLZZ ("Solid Gold Wheels") in late 1982. WLZZ also ran a short lived country format and returned to simulcasting WZUU-FM and the WZUU calls after that. The station split away from the FM in January 1986 to run a syndicated urban gold format as WMVP, prior to the station's sale to All-Pro Broadcasting in 1988.

1290 was originally a daytime-only station licensed to Milwaukee until 1980, when it was granted a power increase from 1,000 watts to 5,000 watts day and night and a city of license change to Greenfield, Wisconsin.

The station had been playing R&B oldies or urban adult contemporary music, with some local talk shows, since 1986. The changeover to an all-talk format happened in 2004. The station's call letters were WMVP for many years ("MVP" referred to owner Willie Davis' pro football years with the Green Bay Packers). WLUP-AM in Chicago purchased the call letters from Davis for their sports format, and 1290 AM became WMCS in December 1993. The WMCS call sign stood for "Milwaukee's Community Station", to emphasize the station's heavy community involvement.

In December 2004, WMCS began airing the syndicated ESPN Radio broadcast after sunset, in partnership with daytime-only sports station WAUK (then at 1510 AM) as "Milwaukee's ESPN Radio...1510 days, 1290 nights." The sports format later became home to play-by-play broadcasts for Marquette University men's college basketball and the AHL's Milwaukee Admirals via WAUK.

On January 22, 2008, Good Karma Broadcasting, owner of WAUK, purchased religious station WRRD (540) in Jackson, Wis. from Salem Communications, and moved WAUK's sports talk format to the full-time signal on February 12, casting doubt on the nighttime simulcast agreement with WMCS.

On June 30, 2008, WMCS began airing its own content, consisting of blues and gospel music programming, in addition to Al Sharpton's daily talk show.

On February 26, 2013, WMCS began stunting with Elvis Presley songs in preparation of a format flip. At 3 p.m. on March 1, the station debuted its new adult standards format as "1290 Martini Radio", with the new WZTI call sign. The format is similar to that of co-owned KZTI in Reno, Nevada, which launched in November 2012.

On July 27, 2014, WZTI began to also air on the FM band on 100.3 FM, using translator station W262CJ, which broadcasts from the Shorewood tower farm on Milwaukee's northwest side and mainly covers the inner north portion of the Milwaukee metro area. The translator uses the HD2 channel of sister FM station WLDB (93.3) rebroadcasting WZTI to translate the signal to analog FM.

On November 1, 2014, WZTI dropped the Adult Standards format and began stunting with Christmas music, billing themselves as "100.3 The Elf." On December 25, 2014, at 5 PM, after playing "Rockin' Around the Christmas Tree" by LeAnn Rimes, the station flipped to rhythmic oldies, branded as "The Party 100.3 FM & 1290 AM." The first song on "The Party" was "1999" by Prince.

On August 25, 2015, at Noon, after playing "Miss You Much" by Janet Jackson, "It's a Shame" by The Spinners and "The Party's Over" by Journey, WZTI shifted to oldies, branded as "Milwaukee's True Oldies 100.3 FM & 1290 AM." The first song on "True Oldies" was "Old Time Rock and Roll" by Bob Seger. The station is utilizing a local feed of Scott Shannon's True Oldies Channel.

On March 7, 2018, WZTI rebranded as "Fonz FM" (named after Happy Days character Arthur "The Fonz" Fonzarelli).

WAWA 1590
Prior to its purchase of WMCS in 1988, All-Pro Broadcasting owned WAWA (1590 AM), a 1,000 watt daytime-only AM station licensed to West Allis, Wisconsin that had signed on in 1961. WAWA aired a traditional R&B format that was popular with Milwaukee's African-American community, and was a serious rival to WNOV during the 1960s, 1970s and 1980s. They also simulcast part-time with their FM sister station at 102.1 FM, and later carried the WLUM call letters, as did their sister station. When All-Pro purchased the stronger 1290 frequency in 1988, they signed off WAWA 1590 for good and returned the station's license to the FCC.

References

External links
WZTI website
Milwaukee radio: a retrospective

ZTI
Radio stations established in 1947
1947 establishments in Wisconsin
Oldies radio stations in the United States